Lailin Abu Hassan (born 16 January 1970) is a Malaysian field hockey player. He competed in the 1992 and 1996 Summer Olympics.

References

External links
 

1970 births
Living people
Field hockey players at the 1992 Summer Olympics
Field hockey players at the 1996 Summer Olympics
1998 Men's Hockey World Cup players
Malaysian male field hockey players
Olympic field hockey players of Malaysia